LGBT slang, LGBT speak, or gay slang is a set of English slang lexicon used predominantly among LGBT people. It has been used in various languages since the early 20th century as a means by which members of the LGBT community identify themselves and speak in code with brevity and speed to others. The acronym LGBT was popularized in the 1990s and stands for Lesbian, Gay, Bisexual, and Transgender.

History and context

Because of sodomy laws and threat of prosecution due to the criminalization of homosexuality, LGBT slang has served as an argot or cant, a secret language and a way for the LGBT community to communicate with each other publicly without revealing their sexual orientation to others. Since the advent of queer studies in universities, LGBT slang and argot has become a subject of academic research among linguistic anthropology scholars.

During the first seven decades of the 20th century, a specific form of Polari was developed by gay men and lesbians in urban centres of the United Kingdom within established LGBT communities. Although there are differences, contemporary British gay slang has adopted many Polari words. The 1964 legislative report Homosexuality and Citizenship in Florida contains an extensive appendix documenting and defining the homosexual slang in the United States at that time. SCRUFF launched a gay-slang dictionary app in 2014, which includes commonly used slang in the United States from the gay community. Specialized dictionaries that record LGBT slang have been found to revolve heavily around sexual matters.

Slang is ephemeral. Terms used in one generation may pass out of usage in another. For example, in the 1960s and 1970s, the terms "cottage" (chiefly British) and "tearoom" (chiefly American) were used to denote public toilets used for sex. By 1999, this terminology had fallen out of use to the point of being greatly unrecognizable by members of the LGBT community at large.

Many terms that originated as gay slang have become part of the popular lexicon. For example, the word drag was popularized by Hubert Selby Jr. in his book Last Exit to Brooklyn. Drag has been traced back by the Oxford English Dictionary (OED) to the late 19th Century.  Conversely, words such as "banjee", while well-established in a subset of gay society, have never made the transition to popular use. Conversations between gay men have been found to use more slang and fewer commonly known terms about sexual behavior than conversations between straight men.

In the Philippines, many LGBT people speak with Swardspeak, or "gay lingo", which is a more extensive use of slang as a form of dialect or way of speaking. Other argots are spoken in southern Africa (Gayle language and IsiNgqumo) and Indonesia (Bahasa Binan). More specifically, in a country like Thailand, LGBT slang was always present in their history due to their religious, behavioral, and social nature. Though, before the term LGBT was introduced, the Thai community would use the terms Kathoey and Tom. The term Kathoey was used to describe transgender women who dress, act, or partake in surgery to become female, and the term Tom as well as "handsome girls" in Thai was used to describe women who liked women. Homosexuality and transgenderism has always existed throughout their history, as well as their behavioral nature did not align with heterosexual ideals.

General slang terms

 100-footer – an obviously gay or lesbian person (as if visible from 100 feet away) (US)
 baby gay – a young or recently out gay person (US)
 baby trans – a young or recently out transgender person (US)
 baths – bathhouses frequented by gay men for sexual encounters (US)
 beach bitch – a gay man who frequents beaches and resorts for sexual encounters (US)
 beard – a person used as a date, romantic partner, or spouse to conceal one's sexual orientation
 beat – having or seeking anonymous gay sex (Australia)
 bent – gay, as opposed to straight (UK)
 bender – someone who has homosexual intercourse (UK)
 binding – a technique in which individuals wear tight clothing, bandages, or compression garments, known as binders, to hide and flatten their breasts
 bottom – a receptive male partner in intercourse; also used as a verb for the state of receiving sexual stimulation
  – someone who dominantly or energetically plays the receptive role in intercourse
  – portmanteau of "boy pussy"; a male anus, in the context of anal sex. Also used to refer to a trans man's vulva.
  – a masculine-looking drag queen
 butchy femme – a gender expression between femme and futch
 camp, campy – effeminacy, effeminate
 clone – a San Francisco or New York Greenwich Village denizen with exaggerated macho behavior and appearance (US)
 closeted – keeping one's sexuality or gender identity a secret from others (US)
 cocksucker – a person who practices fellatio, usually a gay male (US)
 come out (of the closet) – to admit or publicly acknowledge oneself as non-heterosexual/non-cisgender (US)
 cottaging – having or seeking anonymous gay sex in a public toilet, or 'cottage' (UK)
 cruising – seeking a casual gay sex encounter (historically from ancient Rome)
 down-low – homosexual or bisexual activity, kept secret, by men who have sex with men (US)
 en femme, en homme – the act of wearing clothes stereotypically of the opposite sex
 fag hag – a woman who associates mostly or exclusively with gay and bisexual men (US)
 femboy – a feminine or androgynous male
 femme – a feminine homosexual (US)
  – a shorter alternative to folks
  – a gender expression between femme and butch, or a feminine butch
 Game of Flats – an 18th century English term for sex between women
 gaydar – the supposed ability to detect someone's sexual orientation (from gay + radar). Bidar is also called , a jocular pun on Wi-Fi.
 gaymer – an LGBT person who plays video games (from gay + gamer)
 gaysian – a gay Asian person
 gold star – a homosexual who has never had heterosexual sexual intercourse (US)
 heteroflexible – to be mostly heterosexual
 homoflexible – to be mostly gay
 Horatian – from the belated nineteenth century, term utilized at Oxford amongst Lord Byron along with his compatriots to a bisexual individual; a bisexual+ masculine person (UK)
 Molly/Tommy – In 18th century England, the term "molly" was used for male homosexuals, implying effeminacy; "tommy", a slang term for a homosexual woman in use by 1781, and may have been coined by analogy. See Molly house.
  – being “neither/nor” when it comes to normative taboos and self-centered communities
 platinum star gay – gay men who were born by a C-section procedure (US)
 poz – HIV-positive person (US)
 queer – originally a slur against homosexuals, transgender people, and anyone who does not fit society's standards of gender and sexuality; recently reclaimed and used as umbrella term for sexual and gender minorities
 side – someone who prefers not to have anal sex
 swish – effeminate or effeminacy (US)
 switch – see vers
 tomgirl – see femboy
 top – the dominant or inserting sexual partner, usually in a homosexual relation or activity
  – a submissive top, someone who applies sensation or control to a bottom, but does so at the bottom's explicit instructions
 trade – a straight-passing or heterosexual male partner, commonly used by gay men or trans women (derived from Polari) (US)
 vers – a person who enjoys both topping and bottoming, or being dominant and submissive, and may alternate between the two in sexual situations, adapting to their partner

Terms describing gay men 

 artiste – a gay man who excels at fellatio (US)
 auntie – an older, often effeminate and gossipy gay man (US)
 bathsheba – a gay man who frequents gay bathhouses (US)
 chicken – a youthful gay man
 chubby chaser – a man who seeks overweight males (US)
 cupcake – young attractive man, usually a jock type, with a good body.
 daddy – a typically older gay man (US)
 finocchio (from Italy, meaning fennel)
 flit
 flower – a typically effeminate gay man
 friend of Dorothy – a gay person. Historically used as a shibboleth to identify other LGBT people. Likely a reference to Judy Garland, who portrayed Dorothy in The Wizard of Oz (1939) and had a large gay fan-base.
 gaysian – a gay Asian
 light in the loafers / light in the pants / light in the fedora
 punk – a smaller, younger gay man who, in prison settings, is forced into a submissive role and used for the older inmate's sexual pleasure
 queen – a flamboyant or effeminate gay man. Alternatively, short for drag queen.
 bean queen (also taco queen or Salsa queen), gay man attracted to Hispanic men
 brownie queen – obsolete slang for gay man interested in anal sex (used by men who disliked anal sex)
 chicken queen – an older gay man interested in younger or younger appearing men
 grey queen – a gay person who works in financial services;  grey flannel suits).
 potato queen – a gay Asian man attracted mainly to white men.
 rice queen – a gay man attracted mainly to East Asian men.
 twink − a youthful, flamboyant gay man with a slim physique

Slurs 

 anal assassin (UK) or "anal astronaut"
 arse bandit or Ass bandit
 backgammon player (late 18th century Britain)
 batty boy – a slur for gay or effeminate man (Jamaica and U.K.)
 bent, bentshot or bender
 bixa/ (Brazil)
 brownie king / brown piper
 bufter, bufty (mainly Scottish) or booty buffer
 bum boy / bum chum, also bum robber
 butt pirate, butt boy, butt rider, butt pilot, or butt rustler
 chi chi man (Jamaica and the Caribbean)
 cockstruction worker – a gay, bi or queer man who works in construction industry
 homo – shortening of homosexual. Often derogatory.
 homo thug
 faggot / fag – slur against gay men. First recorded in a Portland, Oregon publication in 1914
 fairy – a slur reclaimed by gay men in the 1960s
 flamer
 fruit (also fruit loop, fruit packer, butt fruit) – a slur against gay men; originally a stereotype of gay men as "softer" and "smelling good"
 fudge packer
 ogay
 Pansy
 poof/poofta/ (Australian)
 sod (from Sodomy)
  or veado – a gay male or an effeminate man (lit., a corrupted form of "deer", derived from desviado, meaning deviant) (Brazil)
 paneleiro - a gay male or an effeminate man (Portugal)

Terms describing lesbians 

 baby butch – a young, boyish lesbian (US)
 baby dyke – a young or recently out lesbian (US)
 bambi lesbian – a lesbian who prefers cuddles, hugs, kisses, and other affectionate and sensual non-sexual acts over sexual acts
 bean flicker – Likening the clitoris to a bean
 boi – a boyish lesbian (UK)
  – a lesbian with male presentation
 bull dyke – a masculine lesbian, as opposed to a baby butch or dinky dyke (US)
 butch – a masculine lesbian
 Carpet muncher (or "rug muncher")
 dyke ("bull dyke", "bull dagger", alternatively "bulldagger", "bulldicker"), from 1920s black American slang. A slur reclaimed by women who are attracted to women in the 1950s
 diesel dyke
 drag dyke
 dykon – portmanteau of dyke + icon. A celebrity woman who is seen as an icon by lesbians; may or may not be a lesbian herself (US)
  (in French)
 kiki – a term used primarily from the 1940s until the 1960s to indicate a lesbian who was not butch or femme and did not have a preference for either butch or femme partners
 kitty puncher / pussy puncher – with both "kitty" and "pussy" referring to a woman's vagina, and "puncher" as a variation on various derogatory terms for gay men, such "donut puncher".
 lesbian until graduation (LUG) – a young woman who is assumed to be temporarily experimenting with same-sex behavior, but will ultimately adopt a heterosexual identity
 lipstick lesbian – a lesbian/bisexual woman who displays historically feminine attributes such as wearing make-up, dresses, and high heels
 muff-diver – a lesbian
 pillow princess – a lesbian who prefers to receive sexual stimulation (to bottom) (US)
 soft butch – an androgynous lesbian, in between femme and butch (US)
 stem, stemme – someone whose gender expression falls somewhere between a stud and a femme
 stone butch – a very masculine lesbian, or a butch lesbian who does not receive touch during intercourse, only giving (US)
 stud – a black butch

Terms describing bisexuals 

 AC/DC – reference to "swinging both ways" (US)
  – euphemism for bisexual, derived from ambidextrous
 bicon – portmanteau of bisexual + icon. Used to refer to a bisexual celebrity
 Gillette Blade – a 1950s era term for bisexual women, whose sexuality "cuts both ways"
 switch hitter – from the baseball term
 unicorn – a bisexual, usually female, who desires multiple partners and is willing to join an existing married couple and sexually satisfy both members of the couple. So-named because bisexuals willing to enter to such an arrangement are considered rare or non-existent, while couples seeking such a partner ("unicorn hunters") are common.

Terms describing androgynous or intersex people 

  – Japanese word for hermaphroditism, which is also used in a broader sense for androgyny. The term is also heavily associated with a genre of hentai defined by sexualization of characters simultaneously possesssing breasts, a penis and vagina.
 hermie – an androgynous or intersex person, often considered a slur.
 altersex – a term describing an alternative sex in fiction or a body plan that is usually inaccessible in real life.

Terms describing transgender and non-binary people 

  – a transgender woman who socially presents in a masculine gender role, typically in places where transgender individuals are discriminated against, or due to not being out as transgender.
 Copenhagen capon – a transsexual; someone who has undergone sex reassignment surgery. The term alludes to Christine Jorgensen, a trans woman who underwent sex reassignment surgery in Copenhagen in the 1950s. A capon is a neutered rooster.
  /  – a female-to-male (FtM) and male-to-female (MtF) transgender/transsexual person, respectively, who has not had genital surgery, sometimes used for fictional characters
 egg – a transgender person who has not yet realized they are trans; used by transgender people when aspects of one's personality or behavior remind them of gender-related aspects of themselves before they realized they were trans
  – a non-binary person. Derived from the abbreviation NB.
 hon – a non-passing transgender woman. This term is primarily used by trans women in online communities, especially 4chan. It is considered derogatory.
 lady boy – English translation of kathoey, similar or equivalent to transgender woman, but may refer to feminine gay men or intersex people.
 repressor – a person who is fighting the wish to change their gender expression.
 sapatrans or sapatrava (portmanteau of sapatão + trans) – a term used in Brazil for trans lesbians and lesbian travestis.
 shemale – a trans woman with male genitalia and possibly female secondary sex characteristics. Primarily a term used in pornography and often considered derogatory.
  – a trans woman (short for "trans girl"). Sometimes considered derogatory, due to its association with transgender pornography.
  /  – a trans man (short for "trans boy" and "trans guy")
 tranarchist – transgender anarchism.
 tranny – slur used for transgender people.
  (portmanteau of trans + lesbian) – a transgender lesbian. See also .
  — slur for someone whose perceived gender is opposite their anatomical sex, particularly a trans woman or effeminate boy. Implies that others who are attracted to them (typically heterosexual men) are maliciously deceived (i.e. "trapped") regarding their "real" gender.  Considered derogatory and dehumanizing.

Terms related to transgender and non-binary people 

 chaser / tranny chaser – someone attracted to transgender people. Often used in a pejorative fashion, chasers to value them for their trans status alone, rather than being attracted to them as a person
 clock – to recognize someone as transgender.
 deadname – as a noun, a transgender person's birth name. As a verb, to refer to someone by their deadname.
 girldick – a transfeminine person's penis, especially one changed by hormone use. Also known as girlcock or gock.
 malefail – typically of transmasculine people, to be gendered as feminine when trying to present in a masculine gender role.
 packing – the act of wearing padding or a phallic object to present the appearance of a penis
 passing – being perceived by strangers as cisgender.
 skoliosexual – to describe attraction to non-binary people.
 stealth – passing to the extent that most people do not know that you are trans.
 TERF – acronym for "trans-exclusionary radical feminist"; a feminist whose advocacy excludes or opposes the rights of trans women; more generally, anyone hostile to transgender people. Such feminists typically prefer the term gender critical.

Terms describing cisgender or heterosexual people 

 breeder – a heterosexual person, especially one with children
 cishet – Someone who is cisgender and heterosexual and/or heteroromantic.
 chaser – a cisgender person who has a sexual fetish for transgender people, usually transgender women.
 fag hag – a heterosexual woman who specifically associates with gay men.
 fag stag – heterosexual man who enjoys company of gay men.
  – a cisgender woman who identifies as a heterosexual woman except in the context of her attraction to gay/bisexual men; in these instances, she regards herself as a gay man too.
 guydyke or lesboy – a cisgender man who identifies as a heterosexual man except in the context of his attraction to lesbian/bisexual women; in these instances, he regards himself as a lesbian too.

Terms describing asexuality or aromanticity 
 ace – short for asexual.
 aro – short for aromantic
 , aro-ace, aro/ace – both aromantic and asexual
 ace of spades – an aromantic asexual
 ace of hearts – a romantic asexual
 ace of diamond – a demiromantic demisexual
 ace of swords – a greyromantic greysexual
 squish – a non-romantic or platonic version of crush
 queerplatonic relationship – committed intimate relationships which are not romantic nor (necessarily) sexual in nature
 zucchini – queerplatonic partner.

LGBT subgroups 

The following slang terms have been used to represent various types of people within the LGBT community:

 bear – a larger and often hairier man who projects an image of rugged masculinity. The bear subgroup is among the oldest and largest of the LGBT community. Pride.com says "Bears are on the heavier side, either muscular, beefy, or chunky. They wouldn't dream of shaving their body hair (which comes in abundance) and they usually have a full beard to match. They exude masculinity, and are some of the kindest men you'll meet in your entire life." Attitude magazine says bears are "typically older" with a big build, a belly, and lots of hair. There are many bear subtypes, including the black bear (Black or African American men), the brown bear (Hispanic men), the grizzly bear ("dominant bears of extreme stature or hairiness"), the koala bear (Australian men), the panda bear (men of Asian descent), and the polar bear, which represents an older bear with white hair.
 cub – a younger bear. Pride.com describes cubs as "baby bears" or "large, hairy guys in their teens and 20's who are on their way to becoming a bear".
 bear chaser – a man who pursues bears
 otter – a man who is slender and hairy.
 wolf – Pride.com says, "Similar to an otter, a wolf has some hair and is in between a twink and a bear. However, there are some key differences between wolves and otters. Wolves typically have a lean, muscular build and are sexually aggressive." Attitude says wolves are "typically older and masculine" with a "muscular/athletic build".
 bull – Pride.com says a bull is a "hunky, muscular" bodybuilder who weighs 200 pounds or more. The website says, "These men are big, strong and have muscles you didn't even know existed." Attitude says bulls have a "super-muscular build" with any hair style, and can be any age.
 chicken – a young twink. Attitude says chickens are "hairless and young" with a slim or skinny build.
 chickenhawk – a typically older man who seeks younger men. From chickenhawk, a designation for several birds which are thought to hunt chickens.
 pig – someone who is "more focused on sex than anything else, often into kinkier and somewhat seedier sexual practices", according to Pride.com.
 pup / puppy – in animal roleplay, someone who wants to be treated like a puppy, "with love and affection", by a handler. Attitude says pups are "young and submissive" with a slender build and little hair.
 silver fox – an older man with gray hair
 twink – a young or young-looking gay man, with little body hair and a slender build
 twunk – a twink with well-developed physique (from twink + hunk)

See also

 Gender transposition
 Handkerchief code
 LGBT linguistics
 Terminology of homosexuality

References

Citations

Works cited

Further reading

 
 T., Anna (2020). Opacity - Minority - Improvisation: An Exploration of the Closet Through Queer Slangs and Postcolonial Theory. Bielefeld: Transcript. .

External links
 Lavender Linguistics, from Guardian Unlimited
 Frederick, Brian J. (2012) Partying with a purpose: Finding meaning in an online "party 'n' play" subculture 

 
Slang terms
LGBT-related slurs
Sociolinguistics lists
Lists of slang
Wikipedia glossaries using unordered lists